The Czechoslovak Women's Basketball Championship was the premier women's basketball league in former Czechoslovakia. Founded in 1933, it was disestablished sixty years later following the country's dissolution and replaced by the Czech League and the Slovak Extraliga replacing it. Sparta Praha was the most successful team in the championship with 23 titles between 1948 and 1987, followed by Slovan Orbis and Slavia VŠ Praha with nine. While the championship was mostly dominated by Czech teams its four last editions were won by  
Slovakia's ŠKP Banská Bystrica and Ružomberok.

History

List of champions

 1933 VBVS Prague
 1934 VBVS Prague
 1935 VBVS Prague
 1936 VBVS Prague
 1937 Strakova Akademie
 1938 Strakova Akademie
 1939 Strakova Akademie
 1940 Strakova Akademie
 1941 UNCAS Prague
 1942 UNCAS Prague
 1943 UNCAS Prague
 1944 UNCAS Prague
 1946 Železničářky Hradec Králové
 1947 Železničářky Hradec Králové
 1948 Sparta Praha
 1949 Sparta Praha
 1950 Sparta Praha
 1951 Žabovřesky Brno
 1952 Sparta Praha
 1953 Sparta Praha

 1954 Slovan Orbis
 1955 Slavia ITVS Praha
 1956 Slovan Orbis
 1957 Slovan Orbis
 1958 Sparta Praha
 1959 Slovan Orbis
 1960 Slovan Orbis
 1961 Slovan Orbis
 1962 Slovan Orbis
 1963 Sparta Praha
 1964 Slovan Orbis
 1965 Slovan Orbis
 1966 Sparta Praha
 1967 Sparta Praha
 1968 Sparta Praha
 1969 Sparta Praha
 1970 Slavia VŠ Praha
 1971 Sparta Praha
 1972 Sparta Praha
 1973 Slavia VŠ Praha

 1974 Sparta Praha
 1975 Sparta Praha
 1976 Sparta Praha
 1977 Sparta Praha
 1978 Sparta Praha
 1979 Sparta Praha
 1980 Sparta Praha
 1981 Sparta Praha
 1982 Slavia VŠ Praha
 1983 VŠ Praha
 1984 VŠ Praha
 1985 VŠ Praha
 1986 Sparta Praha
 1987 Sparta Praha
 1988 VŠ Praha
 1989 VŠ Praha
 1990 TJ Slávia PF Banská Bystrica
 1991 Ružomberok
 1992 Ružomberok
 1993 Ružomberok
2018 USK Prague

References

Czechoslovak
1933 establishments in Czechoslovakia
1993 disestablishments in the Czech Republic
1993 disestablishments in Slovakia
Basketball women
Sports leagues established in 1933